Colonel Gore’s Second Case is a 1925  detective novel by the Irish writer Lynn Brock. It was the second in his series of seven novels featuring the character of Colonel Wyckham Gore. Gore enjoyed popularity during the early stages of the Golden Age of Detective Fiction. After solving his first case Gore now establishes his own detective agency.

Synopsis
At a golf club in the West Country, several murders and attempted murders take place. Gore leads the investigation into the crimes but he himself comes under attack.

References

Bibliography
 Herbert, Rosemary. Whodunit?: A Who's Who in Crime & Mystery Writing. Oxford University Press, 2003.
 Reilly, John M. Twentieth Century Crime & Mystery Writers. Springer, 2015.
 Turnbull, Malcolm J. Victims Or Villains: Jewish Images in Classic English Detective Fiction. Popular Press, 1998.

1925 British novels
British mystery novels
British thriller novels
Novels by Lynn Brock
Novels set in England
British detective novels
William Collins, Sons books